Loxophlebia ducallis is a moth of the subfamily Arctiinae. It was described by Peter Jörgensen in 1935. It is found in Paraguay.

References

Loxophlebia
Moths described in 1935